Gustaf Elmer Lindskog (7 February 1903 – 4 August 2002) was a thoracic surgeon and the William H. Carmalt Professor of Surgery and chair of surgery at the Yale School of Medicine, best known for having participated in the first pharmaceutical treatment of cancer.

Biography
Lindskog was born in Boston, Massachusetts in 1903. He received his B.Sc. degree from the Massachusetts Agricultural College in 1923 and his M.D. degree from Harvard Medical School in 1928, then served for four years as a lieutenant commander in the Medical Corps of the United States Navy during World War II.

Bibliography
Thoracic and Cardiovascular Surgery & Related Pathology with Averill Liebow and William Glenn (1953, 1962, 1975)

References

External Links 

 Gustaf E. Lindskog Papers. Historical Library, Cushing/Whitney Medical Library, Yale University

1903 births
2002 deaths
Massachusetts Agricultural College alumni
Harvard Medical School alumni
Yale School of Medicine faculty